Luvuyo Howard Phewa (born 8 November 1999), is a South African footballer who currently plays as a midfielder for Real Kings.

Career statistics

Club

Notes

International goals
Scores and results list South Africa's goal tally first.

References

1999 births
Living people
South African soccer players
Association football defenders
National First Division players
Real Kings F.C. players
South Africa international soccer players
South Africa under-20 international soccer players